NCTV may refer to:

 National College Television, a campus television network from the 1980s
 Niños Cantores Televisión, a  Venezuelan regional television channel
 Nationaal Coördinator Terrorismebestrijding en Veiligheid, the Dutch official counter-terrorism and national security unit